The Pumaman is a 1980 Italian  superhero film co-written and directed by Alberto De Martino, starring Walter George Alton as the title character and Donald Pleasence as the villain. It was featured in a 1998 episode of Mystery Science Theater 3000.

Plot
Thousands of years ago, aliens visited the Earth and became gods to the Aztecs. The aliens fathered the Pumaman, a man-god with supernatural powers who would guard the people of Earth. The original Pumaman was entrusted a gold mask with the ability to control people's minds.

In present-day London, Jane Dodson, archaeologist and daughter of the Dutch ambassador, has uncovered the mask and deciphered its instructions: when aimed, it can control their mind. Her employer, the villainous Dr. Kobras, plans to use it to overtake the minds of world leaders, and Jane is his first victim. Kobras, realizing the Pumaman will be after the mask, begins a campaign to discover Pumaman’s identity.

American paleontologist Tony Farms survives defenestration by a mysterious Aztec named Vadinho. Some time later, Jane invites Tony to a party at the Dutch embassy, so Kobras' mind slaves can kill him. Later, Vadinho confronts Tony and explains the Pumaman’s powers and origins. He claims to a skeptical Tony that his full abilities will develop when he dons a magical golden belt.

Kobras' henchmen try to subdue Tony at the embassy party, but he manages to fight them off and escapes by flying from the roof after donning Pumaman's magic belt. Vadinho explains Kobras' sinister scheme and persuades Tony to follow Kobras to his lair. The henchmen swarm out to shoot down Tony, but he evades them.

Meanwhile, Vadinho, via his mystical amulet, learns Kobras' location. Tony uses an electronic position indicator borrowed from a policeman friend to the villainous lair. Kobras has convened and carried out his plan of absorbing the minds of world leaders. Kobras orders Jane to shoot Tony, but her affections for him helps resist the order. Kobras fends off Tony's attack with a force field that strips Tony of his powers.

Kobras twice attempts mind control on Tony, but Vadinho helps Tony focus his mind on resisting the spell before escaping. Vadinho teaches Tony another superpower, which slows down his metabolism enough to fool Kobras into believing Tony is dead. Vadinho damages the mind control apparatus by throwing a stick of dynamite. Freed from Kobras' control, Jane smashes the replica of Tony's head, which restores his Pumaman powers. He joins the fight with Vadinho and defeats all of the henchmen. Kobras escapes to a helicopter. Tony catches up to him and, with some deft aerial maneuvering, manages to crash the chopper with Kobras inside.

The world now safe, Vadinho, Tony and Jane head to Stonehenge with the mask. Vadinho summons the aliens with his amulet, and before joining them to return the mask to the Andes, he tells Tony to look for him when it is time to train his future son to succeed him as the next Pumaman. The film ends as Tony flies into the air with Jane and embraces her.

Cast
 Walter George Alton as Professor Tony Farms / Puma Man
 Donald Pleasence as Kobras
 Miguel Angel Fuentes as Vadinho
 Sydne Rome as Jane Dobson
 Benito Stefanelli as Rankin
 Silvano Tranquili as Henchman
 Guido Lollobrigida as Henchman

Production
In the late 1970s, following such science fiction films, including Close Encounters of the Third Kind, Star Wars and Superman became blockbusters, Italian filmmakers began injecting science fiction themes into their films.

Director Alberto De Martino stated that the film "was a production based on the trend of the moment. I had always done it that way and always done well. But regarding this genre of film, there was the audience's diffidence toward Italian movies featuring special effects. They knew we were not up to the task, and didn't take us seriously." 
De Martino was also unhappy with the script and attempted to add humour as an effort to save the film.

In November 2007, Alton was interviewed in a satirical fake news sketch on The Daily Show with Jon Stewart.

De Martino noted problems with the special effects, stating that Italo Zingarelli had purchased a camera in Germany to create the flying effects, but the technicians were unable to properly use it. To avoid going beyond schedule, these shots were done with a blue screen in just two days.

Release
The Pumaman was released theatrically in Italy in 1980.

The film was also made available through the Mystery Science Theater 3000 television show, appearing on a season 9 episode on April 4, 1998. Shout! Factory later included the original film as a bonus feature alongside the MST3K version on the Volume XXIX DVD box set, released on March 25, 2014.

Reception
The director Alberto De Martino declared the film as "the only pic I did wrong in my whole career" and that "When I saw it was a flop, I started asking myself questions. I had made a film I shouldn't have. However it did well abroad and managed to get the guaranteed minimum back, otherwise I'd have had to sell my house. It did not even gross half a billion lire in Italy."

In his book on Italian cinema, Howard Hughes described the film as "one of the worst superhero movies of all", noting an "awful script" and that the film was "amateurish in all departments, but the flying sequences stand out, as becaped Puma Man is suspended, flailing, by the seat of his pants from wires."

References

Footnotes

Sources

External links
 
 Pumaman at International Hero
 Internet Movie Database Biography for Walter George Alton
 Official Mystery Science Theater 3000 episode guide entry

1980 films
1980s Italian films
1980s rediscovered films
1980s superhero films
Italian science fiction films
Italian superhero films
Films directed by Alberto De Martino
Film superheroes
Films about mind control
Films set in London
Mockbuster films